Thaddeus Betts (May 3, 1724 – March 22, 1807) was a physician and member of the Connecticut House of Representatives from Norwalk in the sessions of October 1774, October 1775, May and October 1776, May 1784, October 1785, and May 1786.

He was the son of John Betts, Jr. and Demaris Lockwood. He graduated from Yale University  prior to 1752, and upon graduation, won a Berkeley Scholarship. As early as 1752, he settled in Ridgefield, but moved back to Norwalk soon afterwards. He married Mary Gold on November 8, 1752, but she died 12 days later. He married Elizabeth Maltby on May 15, 1754. They had one son, William Maltby Betts, who also served in the Connecticut General Assembly, was a judge, and father of Thaddeus Betts, lieutenant governor.

He served in the Connecticut General Assembly representing Norwalk in 1774, 1775, 1776.

An M.D. degree was conferred on him by the Connecticut Medical Society in 1797. His wife Elizabeth died on February 8, 1789. He married the widow of a former classmate, Daniel Lyman, on November 8, 1789.

He died in Norwalk on March 22, 1807.

References 

1724 births
1807 deaths
18th-century American physicians
Burials in Mill Hill Burying Ground
Members of the Connecticut House of Representatives
Politicians from Norwalk, Connecticut
Yale University alumni